"Ponies" is a song recorded by American country pop artist Michael Johnson.  It was released in June 1987 as the fourth single from the album Michael Johnson.  The song reached #26 on the Billboard Hot Country Singles & Tracks chart.  The song was written by Jeffrey Bullock.

Chart performance

References

1987 singles
1987 songs
Michael Johnson (singer) songs
Song recordings produced by Brent Maher
RCA Records singles